Anderson Township is a township located southeastern Hamilton County along the Ohio and Little Miami Rivers, approximately 13 miles southeast of downtown Cincinnati. The population was 43,876 at the 2020 census.

History
Anderson Township's earliest settlement came in 1788, when pioneer Benjamin Stites settled near the mouth of the Little Miami River. The treaty of Easton forbade entering Ohio. but because England had been run out in the Revolutionary War, the local natives did not know treaty was void. The township was organized in 1793 as part of the Virginia Military District and was bounded by the Ohio and Little Miami Rivers, and the mouth of the Eight Mile Creek to the east. The township was important during its early days as the site of Flinn's Ford, the southernmost crossing of the Little Miami River. Anderson Township remained mainly undeveloped forest and agricultural land until post-World War II suburbanization brought new infrastructure to the community. The population grew by an average of 1,000 persons per year from the 1950s through the early 1990s bringing massive residential and commercial developments to the area. Anderson Township is named for Richard Clough Anderson Sr., Virginia's chief surveyor when the township was created.

Anderson Township became a qualified Tree City USA as recognized by the National Arbor Day Foundation in 2009.

Geography
Located in the southeastern corner of the county between the Ohio and Little Miami rivers and a line extending due south from the confluence of the latter's East Fork and main channels (west of which belongs to Clermont County), Anderson Township has the following borders:
Linwood, Mt. Washington, East End, and California (all, officially, of Cincinnati) - west
Mariemont - northwest
Plainville (officially, Columbia Township) - north
Terrace Park - northeast
Summerside, Mt. Carmel, and Tobasco (all, officially, of Union Township, Clermont County) - east
Locust Grove (officially, Pierce Township, Clermont County) - southeast
Campbell County, Kentucky - south and southwest

Other municipalities and subdivisions of note that neighbor the township not directly, but by proximity of one-eighth of a mile or less, include Mt. Lookout, Hyde Park, Fairfax, and Milford.

Also of note is the fact that Anderson's nearest neighbors to the west, Mt. Washington and California, are functionally exclaves of the City of Cincinnati, impossible to reach via land or water without crossing into territory administered by Anderson Township (which controls the Little Miami River as it exists within Hamilton County). The two themselves barely connect, only able to do so via a narrow terrestrial connection spanning approximately  exists, but contains no road, public or otherwise, and spans ten private land parcels uniformly developed and all facing away from the hilltop center of the community. Thus, this is not a passage available to the public. The official neighborhood borders of Mt. Washington were drawn to "overflow" from this bottleneck slightly and include an unestablished group of smaller residential subdivisions between the bottleneck and the Little Miami delta, where Mt. Washington and California meet and at least avoid their individual designations as exclaves of their mother city.

Anderson Township includes the following census-designated places:
Cherry Grove
Coldstream
Dry Run
Forestville
Fruit Hill
Salem Heights
Sherwood
Turpin Hills

As of 1990, 36% of Anderson Township had been developed into suburban communities for Cincinnati, 13% into farmland, and the remainder being left as woodland.

Demographics
As of the census of 2020, there were 44,040 people in the township, including 704 non-U.S. citizens. The population density was 1,448.6 people per square mile. There were 17,631 housing units. The racial makeup of the township was 90.8% White, 3.4% African American, and around 6% of all other races combined.

In the township the population was spread out, with 28.2% under the age of 20, 11.8% from 20 to 34, 28.9% from 35 to 44, 22.8% from 45 to 59, and 16.7% who were 65 years of age or older. For every 100 females there were 93.9 males.

The median income for a household in the township was $135,611.

Government
The township is governed by a three-member board of trustees, who are elected in November of odd-numbered years to a four-year term beginning on the following January 1. Two are elected in the year after the presidential election and one is elected in the year before it. There is also an elected township fiscal officer, who serves a four-year term beginning on April 1 of the year after the election, which is held in November of the year before the presidential election. Vacancies in the fiscal officership or on the board of trustees are filled by the remaining trustees. Anderson Township is also a member of the Ohio-Kentucky-Indiana Regional Council of Governments.

Police and fire services 
Police services are provided by the Hamilton County Sheriff's Office. Fire and Emergency Medical Services are provided by the Anderson Township Fire Department.

Transportation

Major roads 
Anderson Township is served by Interstate 275, US Route 52, State Route 32 and State Route 125 (Beechmont Avenue). Interstate 275 crosses the Ohio River into Kentucky near the southern border of the township on the Combs-Hehl Bridge. Anderson Township is also in close proximity to US Route 27, US Route 50 and Interstate 471.

Transit 
Anderson Township is served by the Southwest Ohio Regional Transit Authority, which provides local and commuter bus service on various routes to and from the township. Uber and Lyft operate in the township.

Airports 
Cincinnati Municipal Lunken Airport (IATA: LUK) provides private and limited amounts of commercial air service and is located immediately southwest of the township near the confluence of the Ohio and Little Miami Rivers. The Cincinnati/Northern Kentucky International Airport (IATA: CVG) provides most commercial air service to the area and is located approximately 20 miles southwest in nearby Hebron, Kentucky.

Rail 
Rail service (freight) is provided by Norfolk Southern Railway in the northernmost portions of the township on a rail line between Cincinnati and Portsmouth.

Education

Schools 
Nearly all of Anderson Township is located in the Forest Hills Local School District. The district boasts an "Excellent with Distinction" rating from Ohio Department of Education.

Forest Hills Local School District serves an approximate student population of 7,655 in pre-kindergarten through twelfth grade. The district employs 422 full-time classroom teachers and the district's overall student/teacher ratio is 18.1:1, with an instructional expense of $4,048 per student.

Schools within the district include:
 Anderson High School
 Ayer Elementary School
 Maddux Elementary School
 Mercer Elementary School
 Nagel Middle School
 Sherwood Elementary School
 Summit Elementary School
 Turpin High School
 Wilson Elementary School
In 2005, the Forest Hills School District was presented a banner from the Ohio Department of Education recognizing the achievement of receiving an "Excellent" rating on the State Report Card for five consecutive years. Only 47 of the state's 614 school districts have achieved an Excellent rating for five consecutive years putting the district in the top 8 percent of districts in the state. This was achieved with more than 7,000 students and by spending less per pupil than many of the other school districts that are rated excellent.

Library 
Anderson Township is served by a branch of the Public Library of Cincinnati and Hamilton County., and consistently has one of the highest rates of circulation of the Library's branches.

Notable people
 Marty Brennaman, sportscaster
 Thom Brennaman, sportscaster; graduate of Anderson High School
 Marc Burch, professional soccer player for Seattle Sounders FC; 2002 graduate of Turpin High School
 Dennis Courtney, aka Denis Beaulne, Broadway Actor and Director; graduate of Anderson High School
 Richard Dotson, former MLB pitcher (Chicago White Sox, New York Yankees, Kansas City Royals); graduate of Anderson High School
 Ira Joe Fisher, broadcaster, poet, and educator
 Julie Isphording, long-distance runner, competed in 1984 Olympics in Los Angeles; graduate of Anderson High School
 Jensen Lewis, former MLB pitcher for Cleveland Indians; graduate of Anderson High School
 Vicki Lewis, actress of film, stage, and television; graduate of Anderson High School
 Jim Leyritz, former professional baseball player, mostly with the New York Yankees; graduate of Turpin High School
 Andrew Norwell, NFL guard for Jacksonville Jaguars; graduate of Anderson High School
 Allen M. Potter, American television soap opera producer
 Dave Wilson, gold and silver medalist in swimming, 1984 Olympics in Los Angeles; graduate of Anderson High School
 Michelle Yi, contestant on CBS' Survivor: Fiji; 2002 graduate of Turpin High School
 Marilyn Zayas, judge on Ohio's First District Court of Appeals

Recreation 
Anderson Township is home to Coney Island Amusement Park, Sunlite Pool, Riverbend Music Center and Belterra Park Gaming & Entertainment Center. It has become known for its numerous parks, greenspaces and outdoor activities. The Anderson Parks district is an impressive organization supporting 9 parks and an indoor RecPlex, totaling over 500 acres of land.   The Anderson Foundation for Parks & Recreation was established in 1991 to help support these parks and expand their offerings and mission.

References

External links 
Township website
Forest Hills Local Schools
History of Anderson Township found in this PDF from Township website
Anderson Parks
Anderson Foundation for Parks & Recreation

Townships in Hamilton County, Ohio
Populated places established in 1788
1788 establishments in the Northwest Territory
Townships in Ohio